William Hipple Galloway (March 24, 1882 – February 17, 1943), nicknamed "Hippo", was an American-Canadian professional baseball player. Born in Buffalo, New York, Galloway grew up in Dunnville, Ontario, and is considered "the first black Canadian to play organized baseball."

Biography
Galloway grew up playing both baseball and ice hockey. In 1899, he played hockey for the Woodstock, Ontario, club in the Central Ontario Hockey Association, where he was known as a "cool and collected" player on the ice. In the summer of 1899, he played minor league baseball for the Woodstock Bains of the Canadian League, but was dismissed from the club when a white player objected to his presence. Galloway was the last black player in Canadian organized baseball until Jackie Robinson in 1946. Following his dismissal, Galloway left Canada to join the Cuban X-Giants of the Negro leagues for the 1900 season.

References

External links
, or Seamheads

1882 births
1943 deaths
Sportspeople from Buffalo, New York
Sportspeople from Haldimand County
Black Canadian ice hockey players
Black Canadian baseball players
Ice hockey people from Ontario
Baseball people from Ontario
Baseball outfielders
Baseball second basemen
Cuban X-Giants players
Woodstock Bains players
Canadian Baseball Hall of Fame inductees